Pachychilus, common name the jute snails, is a genus of freshwater snails with an operculum, aquatic gastropod mollusk in the family Pachychilidae.

Pachychilus is the type genus of the family Pachychilidae.

Distribution 
The distribution of species in the genus Pachychilus includes:
 Cuba (2 species), Venezuela, Belize, Mexico, and others.

Species 
Species within the genus Pachychilus include:
 
  † Pachychilus anagrammatus Dall, 1913
 Pachychilus apheles F. G. Thompson, 1967
 Pachychilus apis (I. Lea & H. C. Lea, 1851)
 Pachychilus atratus Pilsbry & Hinkley, 1910
 † Pachychilus caboblanquensis Weisbord, 1962 
 † Pachychilus cancelloides (Aldrich, 1911) 
 † Pachychilus canoasensis Olsson, 1931 
 Pachychilus chrysalis (Brot, 1872)
 Pachychilus cinereus (Morelet, 1849)
 Pachychilus conicus (d'Orbigny, 1842)
 Pachychilus corpulentus F. G. Thompson, 1967
 Pachychilus corvinus (Morelet, 1849)
 Pachychilus cumingii I. Lea & H. C. Lea, 1851
 Pachychilus dalli Pilsbry, 1896
 † Pachychilus dimorphica (Woods, 1922) 
 Pachychilus explicatus P. Fischer & Crosse, 1892
 Pachychilus fuentesi Aguayo, 1936
 † Pachychilus fulvus Garvie, 2013 †
 Pachychilus gassiesii (Reeve, 1860)
 Pachychilus glaphyrus (Morelet, 1849)
 Pachychilus godmanni (Tristram, 1863)
 Pachychilus gracilis Tristram, 1864
 † Pachychilus gracillimus (Pilsbry & Olsson, 1935) 
 Pachychilus graphium (Morelet, 1849)
 Pachychilus hellerii (Brot, 1872)
 Pachychilus hinkleyi (W. B. Marshall, 1920)
 Pachychilus humerosus Pilsbry & Hinkley, 1910
 Pachychilus immanis (Morelet, 1851)
 Pachychilus indiorum (Morelet, 1849) 
 Pachychilus intermedius (von dem Busch, 1844)
 Pachychilus jansoni H. Adams, 1871
 Pachychilus lacustris (Morelet, 1849)
 Pachychilus laevisimus (G.B. Sowerby I, 1824)
 Pachychilus largillierti (Philippi, 1843)
 Pachychilus larvatus (Brot, 1877)
 Pachychilus liebmanni (Philippi, 1848)
 Pachychilus moctezumensis Pilsbry & Hinkley, 1910
 Pachychilus monachus Pilsbry & Hinkley, 1910
 Pachychilus nigratus (Poey, 1858) - endemic to Villa Clara, Cuba
 Pachychilus obeliscus (Reeve, 1861)
 Pachychilus oerstedii Mörch, 1861
 Pachychilus olssoni Pilsbry, 1950
 Pachychilus panucula  (Morelet, 1851)
 Pachychilus pasionensis Pilsbry, 1956
 Pachychilus pilsbryi E. von Martens, 1899
 Pachychilus planensis (I. Lea, 1858)
 Pachychilus pleurotoma Pilsbry & Hinkley, 1910
 Pachychilus pluristriatus (Say, 1831)
 Pachychilus polygonatus (I. Lea & H. C. Lea, 1851)
 Pachychilus potomarchus Pilsbry, 1893
 Pachychilus pottsianus Hinkley, 1920
 Pachychilus pyramidalis (Morelet, 1849)
 Pachychilus radix (Brot, 1872)
 Pachychilus rasconensis Thiele, 1928
 Pachychilus rivorosai Pilsbry, 1893
 Pachychilus rubidus (I. Lea, 1857)
 Pachychilus rusticulus (von dem Busch, 1858)
 Pachychilus salvini (Tristram, 1863)
 Pachychilus sargi (Crosse & P. Fischer, 1875)
 † Pachychilus satillensis (Aldrich, 1911) 
 Pachychilus saussurei (Brot, 1860)
 Pachychilus schiedeanus (Philippi, 1843)
 Pachychilus schumoi Pilsbry, 1931
 Pachychilus subexaratus Crosse & P. Fischer, 1891
 Pachychilus subnodosus (Philippi, 1847)
 Pachychilus suturalis Pilsbry & Hinkley, 1910
 † Pachychilus tarataranoides (O. Haas, 1942) 
 † Pachychilus terebriformis (J. Morris, 1859) 
 Pachychilus tristis Pilsbry & Hinkley, 1910
 Pachychilus turati (A. Villa & G. B. Villa, 1854)
 Pachychilus vallesensis Hinkley, 1907

subgenus Pachychiloides Wenz, 1939
 † Pachychilus lawtoni Perrilliat, Vega, Espinosa & Naranjo-Garcia, 2008 - fossil from Northeastern Mexico
Species brought into synonymy
 Pachychilus aquatilis (Reeve, 1859): synonym of Doryssa aquatilis (Reeve, 1859)
 Pachychilus drakei Arnold & Hannibal in Hannibal, 1912 †: synonym of Goniobasis drakei (Arnold & Hannibal in Hannibal, 1912) † (new combination)
 Pachychilus glaphyra (Morelet, 1849): synonym of Pachychilus glaphyrus (Morelet, 1849) (incorrect gender of species epithet)
 Pachychilus indifferens Crosse & P. Fischer, 1891: synonym of Pachychilus corvinus indifferens Crosse & P. Fischer, 1891 (unaccepted rank)
 Pachychilus lawsoni Hannibal, 1912 †: synonym of Lymnaea lawsoni (Hannibal, 1912) † (new combination)
 Pachychilus parvum I. Lea, 1857: synonym of Rehderiella parva (I. Lea, 1857) (original combination)
 Pachychilus pila Pilsbry & Hinkley, 1910: synonym of Amnipila pila (Pilsbry & Hinkley, 1910) (original combination)
 Pachychilus renovatus (Brot, 1862): synonym of Pachychilus cumingii I. Lea & H. C. Lea, 1851 (replacement name for Pachychilus cumingii I. Lea & H. C. Lea, 1851 as a secondary homonym)
 Pachychilus reticancellata [sic] †: synonym of Pachychilus recticancellata (Kobayashi & Suzuki, 1939) † (incorrect subsequent spelling)
 Pachychilus suavis Dall, 1913 †: synonym of Goniobasis suavis (Dall, 1913) †
 Pachychilus tristrami Crosse & P. Fischer, 1892: synonym of Pachychilus gracilis Tristram, 1864 (invalid: unnecessary replacement name for Pachychilus gracilis)
 Pachychilus violaceus (Preston, 1911) - endemic to the area from Santiago de Cuba to Baracoa, Cuba: synonym of Pachychilus nigratus (Poey, 1858) (junior synonym)
 Pachychilus vulneratus P. Fischer & Crosse, 1892: synonym of Pachychilus chrysalis (Brot, 1872) (junior synonym)

Human use 
One of the Maya peoples, the Lacandon people, now Mexico's native peoples from state Chiapas, use the Chiapas species Pachychilus indiorum, known locally as "t’unu", as a type of protein supplement to their diet when animal protein is unavailable. In addition, the shells from this "chuti" snail have great nutritional value, as they provide calcium and slaked lime when burnt. They are often preferred as a lime source over local limestone or other freshwater snail species for their purity as an alkali. The slaked lime is added to maize during the process of making maize dough for tortillas, pozole, and other foods.  Slaked lime allows the release of amino acids such as tryptophan and lysine and the vitamin niacin, which would otherwise be unavailable from the maize (unable to be metabolized) if the lime were not added.

References

External links 
 Lea, I.; Lea, H. C. (1851). Description of a new genus of the family Melaniana, and of many new species of the genus Melania, chiefly collected by Hugh Cuming, Esq., during his zoological voyage in the East , and now first described. Proceedings of the Zoological Society of London. 18: 179-197
  Pilsbry, H. A. (1893). Notes on a collection of shells from the State of Tabasco, Mexico. Proceedings of the Academy of Natural Sciences of Philadelphia. 44: 338-341, pl. 14
 Fischer, P. & Crosse, H. (1870-1902). Études sur les mollusques terrestres et fluviatiles du Mexique et du Guatemala. Mission scientifique au Mexique et dans l'Amerique Centrale. Recherches zoologiques, Partie 7 Volume 1: 702 pp., pls 1-31; volume 2: 731 pp., pls 32-72. Paris: Imprimerie Nationale. Published in 17 livraisons

Pachychilus
Taxa named by Isaac Lea
Gastropod genera